Leroux or Le Roux may refer to:

 Leroux (surname), a surname of French or Breton origin
 Le Roux Smith Le Roux (1914–1963), South African artist, actor and broadcaster
 LeRoux (band), an American rock band

Places
 Le Roux, Ardèche, a municipality in the Ardèche department, France
 Le Roux, Belgium, a village in the municipality of Fosses-la-Ville, Namur province, Belgium

See also
 La Roux, an English synthpop duo
 La Roux (album), their 2009 debut studio album

Roux (disambiguation)